Mahan Air operates scheduled international and domestic flights to 50 destinations in 16 countries in Asia and Europe. As of March 2019, it serves the following destinations:

Destinations

References

Lists of airline destinations